The 520th Air Defense Group  is a disbanded United States Air Force organization. Its last assignment was with the 4706th Air Defense Wing at Truax Field, Wisconsin, where it was inactivated in 1955.  The group was originally activated as a support unit for the 340th Bombardment Group at the end of World War II in Italy and then redeployed to the United States where it was inactivated in 1945.

The group was activated once again in 1953, when ADC established it as the headquarters for a dispersed fighter-interceptor squadron and the medical, maintenance, and administrative squadrons supporting it.  It was replaced in 1955 when ADC transferred its mission, equipment, and personnel to the 327th Fighter Group in a project that replaced air defense groups commanding fighter squadrons with fighter groups with distinguished records during World War II.

History

World War II
The group was first activated during World War II in Italy in late 1944 as the 520th Air Service Group as part of a reorganization of Army Air Forces (AAF) support groups in which the AAF replaced Service Groups that included personnel from other branches of the Army and supported two combat groups with Air Service Groups including only Air Corps units.  Designed to support a single combat group. Its 946th Air Engineering Squadron provided maintenance that was beyond the capability of the combat group, its 770th Air Materiel Squadron handled all supply matters, and its Headquarters & Base Services Squadron provided other support. The group supported the 340th Bombardment Group in Italy.  The group returned to the US and was inactivated in late 1945.  It was disbanded in 1948.

Cold War
During the Cold War, the group was reconstituted, redesignated as the 520th Air Defense Group, and activated at Truax Field in 1953 with responsibility for air defense of the Great Lakes area. It was assigned the 432d Fighter-Interceptor Squadron (FIS) and 433d FIS, which were already stationed at Truax Field, as its operational components. The 432d FIS was flying North American F-86 Sabres, while the 433d FIS was flying Northrop F-89 Scorpions equipped with airborne intercept radar. Both squadrons had been assigned directly to the 31st Air Division. The group also replaced the 78th Air Base Squadron as the USAF host unit for Truax Field.  It was assigned three squadrons to perform its support responsibilities.

In March 1953, the 432d FIS converted to a later radar equipped and Mighty Mouse rocket armed model of the "Sabre". In July 1954, the 433d FIS moved to Alaska and was reassigned. The following month, the 456 FIS was activated to replace the 433d FIS. The 456th FIS was also equipped with "Sabres". The group was inactivated and replaced by the 327th Fighter Group (Air Defense) as part of Air Defense Command's Project Arrow, which was designed to bring back on the active list the fighter units which had compiled memorable records in the two world wars. The group was disbanded once again in 1984.

Lineage
 Constituted as 520th Air Service Group
 Activated on 27 December 1944
 Inactivated ca. 7 November 1945
 Disbanded 8 October 1948
 Reconstituted and redesignated as 520th Air Defense Group on 21 January 1953
 Activated on 16 February 1953
 Inactivated on 18 August 1955
 Disbanded on 27 September 1984

Assignments
 Unknown, 27 December 1944 – 7 November 1945 (probably XII Air Force Service Command until c. July 1945, Third Air Force after August 1945)
 4706th Defense Wing (later 4706th Air Defense Wing), 16 February 1953 – 18 August 1955

Stations
 Cervioni, Italy, 27 December 1944 – 15 April 1945
 Rimini, Italy, 15 April 1945 – 15 July 1945 (sic)
 Naples, Italy, 15 July 1945 – July 1945
 Camp Patrick Henry, VA, 18 July 1945 – August 1945
 Seymour Johnson Field, NC August 1945 – 15 September 1945
 Columbia Army Air Base, SC, 15 September 1945 – ca. 7 November 1945
 Truax Field, WI, 16 February 1953 – 18 August 1955

Components

Operational Squadrons
 432d Fighter-Interceptor Squadron, 16 February 1953 – 18 August 1955
 433d Fighter-Interceptor Squadron, 16 February 1953 – 14 July 1954
 456th Fighter-Interceptor Squadron, 8 August 1954 – 18 August 1955
 Deployed to: George Air Force Base and detached to Western Air Defense Force

Support Units
 520th Air Base Squadron, 16 February 1953 – 18 August 1955
 520th Materiel Squadron, 16 February 1953 – 18 August 1955
 520th Medical Squadron (later 520th USAF Infirmary), 16 February 1953 – 18 August 1955
 770th Air Materiel Squadron, 25 January 1945 – 7 November 1945
 946th Air Engineering Squadron, 25 January 1945 – 7 November 1945

Aircraft
 North American F-86F Sabre, 1953
 North American F-86D Sabre, 1953–1955
 Northrop F-89C Scorpion, 1953–1954
 Lockheed F-94 Starfire, 1953

Commanders
 Col. L. E. Brooks 17 Dec 1944–1945
 Unknown, 16 Feb 1953 – 18 Aug 1955

See also
 List of United States Air Force Aerospace Defense Command Interceptor Squadrons
 List of F-86 Sabre units
 F-89 Scorpion units of the United States Air Force
 F-94 Starfire units of the United States Air Force

References

Notes
Explanatory notes

Footnotes

Bibliography

 Buss, Lydus H.(ed), Sturm, Thomas A., Volan, Denys, and McMullen, Richard F., History of Continental Air Defense Command and Air Defense Command July to December 1955, Directorate of Historical Services, Air Defense Command, Ent AFB, CO, (1956)

Further reading
 Grant, C.L., (1961)  The Development of Continental Air Defense to 1 September 1954, USAF Historical Study No. 126

External links

0520
Aerospace Defense Command units
Military units and formations established in 1953
Military units and formations disestablished in 1984